En marcha ('On March') was a newspaper published from Santa Cruz de Tenerife, Spain, as the organ of the Canarian Regional Federation of Confederación Nacional del Trabajo (CNT). En marcha was launched in 1930. It was published, albeit with some interruptions, until the outbreak of the Spanish Civil War in 1936. The founding director of the newspaper was Bartolomé Hernández. During 1933 Hernández was temporarily substituted by Manuel Pérez. All in all some 200 issues of En marcha were published.

References

1930 establishments in Spain
1936 disestablishments in Spain
Anarchist newspapers
Defunct newspapers published in Spain
Confederación Nacional del Trabajo
Mass media in Santa Cruz de Tenerife
Newspapers published in Spain
Newspapers established in 1930
Publications disestablished in 1936
Spanish-language newspapers